Alessandra Galiotto (born 28 September 1983 in Arzignano) is an Italian sprint canoer who competed in the late 2000s. At the 2008 Summer Olympics in Beijing, she finished eighth in the K-4 500 m event.

References
 Sports-Reference.com profile

1983 births
Canoeists at the 2008 Summer Olympics
Italian female canoeists
Living people
Olympic canoeists of Italy
People from Arzignano
Sportspeople from the Province of Vicenza